The grapheme Ď (minuscule: ď) is a letter in the Czech and Slovak alphabets used to denote , the voiced palatal plosive (precisely alveolo-palatal), a sound similar to British English d in dew. 
It was also used in Polabian. The majuscule of the letter (Ď) is formed from Latin D with the addition of a háček; the minuscule of the letter (ď) has a háček modified to an apostrophe-like stroke instead of a wedge. When collating, Ď is placed right after regular D in the alphabet.

Ď is also used to represent uppercase ð in the coat of arms of Shetland; however, the typical form is Ð.

Encoding

See also
Czech orthography
Czech phonology
Slovak phonology
Slovak orthography

References

Latin letters with diacritics